XHVS-FM 96.3 is a combo radio station in Hermosillo, Sonora. It carries the Máxima adult contemporary format from its owner, Radio S.A.

History
The concession for XEVS-AM 1110 was awarded to Francisco Vidal Moreno in 1960, with an original transmitter location of Villa de Seris, a neighborhood of Hermosillo. Vidal Moreno had previously built and signed on XEDL-AM in the 1940s. In 1994, XEVS was authorized to add an FM station, XHVS-FM 89.7 (later 96.3) and become an AM-FM combo.

After Vidal's death, his estate sold its radio stations to Radio S.A.

XEVS discontinued AM broadcasts in 2017, but the station never formally surrendered its AM authorization.

References

Radio stations in Sonora
Radio stations established in 1960
Mexican radio stations with expired concessions